Comedy Champions is a comedy show that started airing from 15 March 2008 on Sahara One.

Concept
The show will consist of many popular Indian and Pakistani comedians who will perform a standup comedy for the audiences. The show has a new look and feels with a fresh set of jokes that have never been showcased before. Not just that, there are renowned comedians from Pakistan along with Indian artists adding a new flavor to the show.

Host
Karishma Tanna

Contestants
Sunil Pal
Kuldeep Dubey
Rajeev Nigam
Rajeev Thakur
Parveez Siddiqui
Kashif Khan
Rauf Lala
Shakeel Siddiqui
Amir Rambo
Aslam Imran

References

External links 
Comedy Champions Official Site

Sahara One original programming
Indian comedy television series
2008 Indian television series debuts